Cady is a surname that may refer to:

People bearing it include:

 Benjamin A. Cady (1840–1920), American lawyer and politician
 Bertha Chapman Cady (1873–1956), American entomologist and educator
 Burt D. Cady (1874–1952), American politician
 Calvin Brainerd Cady (1851–1928), musician, music teacher and educational philosopher and writer 
 Carol Cady (born 1962), American shot putter and discus thrower
 Charles A. Cady (1819–?), American politician
 Charlie Cady (1865–1909), American baseball player
 Chauncey G. Cady (1803–1893) American farmer and politician
 Claude E. Cady (1878–1953), American politician
 Daniel Cady (1773–1859), American jurist, father of Elizabeth Cady Stanton
 E. F. Cady, American entrepreneur and settler
 Elizabeth Cady Stanton (1815–1902), American suffragist, social activist, abolitionist and leading figure of the early women's rights movement  
 Ernest Cady (1842–1908), American politician and Lieutenant Governor of Connecticut
 Frank Cady (1915–2012), American actor
 Frank A. Cady (1858–1904), American lawyer
 H. Emilie Cady (1848–1941), American homeopathic physician and author
 Hamilton Cady (1874–1943), American chemist
 Harrison Cady (1877–1970), American illustrator
 Hick Cady (1886–1946), American baseball player
 Horace H. Cady (1801–1887), American farmer and politician
 J. Cleaveland Cady (1837–1919), American architect
 Jack Cady (1932–2004), American author
 Jerome Cady (1903–1948), American Hollywood screenwriter
 Mark Cady (1953-2019), American judge
 Virgil H. Cady (1876–1934), American politician
 Walter Guyton Cady (1874–1974), American physicist and electrical engineer

See also

Caddy (name)
 Justice Cady (disambiguation)